Amala Ekpunobi is an American conservative political commentator, talk show host, social media personality and activist. Ekpunobi's activism includes gender, sexuality and critical race theory. In 2022, Ekpunobi began working for PragerU where she hosts her talk show and podcast Unapologetic with Amala. She has also featured numerous times on Fox News and starred in the short film From Unhappy Liberal to Hopeful Conservative on the media outlet The Daily Wire.

Early life and education 
Ekpunobi was raised in a liberal household and was exposed to politics from an early age. She was originally a left-wing activist before undergoing an "ideological transformation".

Filmography 

 From Unhappy Liberal to Hopeful Conservative

References

Living people
American political commentators